Quli Khan, Qulī Khān, Qoli Khan, Qolī Khān is another name of Goli Khun.

See also
 Quli (disambiguation)
 Khan (disambiguation)